Yaverlandia (meaning "of Yaverland Point/Yaverland Battery") is a genus of maniraptoran dinosaur. Known from a partial fossil skull (MIWG 1530) found in Lower Cretaceous strata of the Wessex Formation (Upper Silty Bed; Vectis Formation) on the Isle of Wight. it was described as the earliest known member of the pachycephalosaurid family, but research by Darren Naish shows it to have actually been a theropod, seemingly a maniraptoran. The type species is Y. bitholus.

Discovery and naming
MIWG 1530, the holotype skull, was discovered in 1930, in England and were commented upon by Watson (1930). It was referred to as an iguanodontid of the genus Vectisaurus in 1936. When Steel (1969) followed Hulke (1879) in listing Vectisaurus as an iguanodontid, Peter Malcolm Galton (1971) named the fossil as Yaverlandia, which he described as a pachycephalosaurid since the skull of Yaverlandia was different than that of Vectisaurus (Mantellisaurus). 

In 2012 additional remains were reported, but these have not been described.

Description 
Yaverlandia was about 3 ft (1 m) in length and 1 ft (30 cm) in height.

Classification 
Before being named, Swinton (1936) had MIWG 1530 placed within Mantellisaurus, which was a member of the Iguanodontidae. Galton (1971) upon describing Yaverlandia placed it within the Pachycephalosauridae. Sullivan (2000), Sereno (2000) Naish (2006; unpublished thesis), Sullivan (2006) and Naish (2008) all re-classified Yaverlandia as a maniraptoran.

Paleoecology 
Yaverlandia was found in the Vectis Formation and it would have coexisted with the nodosaur Polacanthus foxii, the neornithischian Hypsilophodon foxii, the iguanodontid Mantellisaurus atherfieldensis, an indeterminate euornithopod, an indetrminate spinosaurid, an indeterminate theropod, the plesiosaur Vectocleidus pastorum and the crocodylomorph Hylaeochampsa vectiana.

References

Early Cretaceous dinosaurs of Europe
Prehistoric maniraptorans
Isle of Wight
Fossil taxa described in 1971
Taxa named by Peter Galton